The "Stake Your Destiny" series of Buffy the Vampire Slayer novels are gamebooks in the style of Choose Your Own Adventure books.

Each novel contains many numbered sections.  Instead of reading the book from start-to-finish, the reader is given a choice at the end of each section.  Depending upon the reader's decision, the reader will be directed to another numbered section that might be anywhere in the book.

Unlike some other gamebooks, Stake Your Destiny novels do not contain any form of game system.

For non-gamebook novels, see the List of Buffy novels.

BS2

These tales take place during Buffy Season 2, (from autumn 1997 up until spring 1998).

Buffyverse
Gamebooks